

Daraa Governorate

Daraa District
 Bosra
 Da'el
 Saham al-Jawlan

Izra' District
 Hirak

Al-Sanamayn District
 Burraq
 al-Harrah
 Inkhil
 Jassem
 Kafr Shams
 Khabab
 Tubna

Homs Governorate

Homs District
 Al-Riqama
 Fairouzeh
 Sadad
 Zaidal
 Al-Mushrifah

Talkalakh District
 Al-Hwash
 Ain albardeh
 Marmarita
 Zweitina
 Amar al-Husn

Palmyra District
 al-Qaryatayn
 al-Sukhnah

al-Rastan District

al-Qusayr District

Latakia Governorate

Latakia District
 Al-Bahluliyah
 Rabia, Syria
 Ayn al-Bayda
 Qastal Ma'af
 Kasab
 Hanadi

Jableh District
 Ayn al-Sharqiyah
 Al-Qutailibiyah
 Ayn Shiqaq
 Daliyah
 Beit Yashout

Al-Haffah District
 Slinfah
 Ayn al-Tinah
 Kinsabba
 Muzayraa
 Salma
 Kfar Delbeh
 Tertyah
 Brouma
 Taouma
 Dwairke
 Kdeen

Qardaha District
 Bustan al-Basha
 Harf al-Musaytirah
 Al-Fakhurah
 Jawbat Burghal

Rif Dimashq Governorate

Markaz Rif Dimashq
 Kiswe, Syria
 Babbila
 Jaramanah
 Al-Malihah
 Kafar Batna
 Arbin
 Qudsaya

Duma District
 Harasta
 Sabaa Biyar
 Dumeir
 Al-Nashabiyah
 Al-Ghizlaniyah
 Harran al-Awamid

Al-Qutayfah District
 Jayroud
 Maaloula
 Al-Ruhaybah
 Ras al-Khashufah

Al-Tall District
 Mneen
 Saidnaya
 Rankous

Yabrud District
 Assal al-Ward

Al-Nabk District
 Deir Atiyah
 Qarah
 Al-Sehl

Zabadani District
 Al-Dimas
 Ayn al-Fijeh
 Madaya, Syria
 Sirghaya
 Bloudan
 Maysalun
 Evra
 Hurayra

Qatana District
 Beit Jen
 Saasaa
 Artouze

Darayya District
 Sahnaya
 Al-Hajar al-Aswad

Tartus Governorate

Tartus District
 Arwad
 Al-Hamidiyah
 Khirbet al-Maazah
 Suda Khawabi
 Al-Karimah
 al-Safsafah

Baniyas District
 Al-Rawda
 Al-Annazah
 Al-Qadmus
 Hammam Wasel
 Al-Tawahin
 Talin

Safita District
 Bayt al-Shaykh Yunis
 Mashta al-Helu
 Al-Bariqiyah
 Sebei
 Al-Sisiniyah
 Ras al-Khashufah

Duraykish District
 Junaynet Ruslan
 Hamin
 Dweir Ruslan

Ash-Shaykh Badr District
 Brummanet al-Mashayekh
 Al-Qamsiyah

Quneitra Governorate

Quneitra District
Khan Arnabah
Khishniyah
Ein Qiniyye
Majdal Shams
Buq'ata
Beer Ajam
Ghajar 
Mas'ade

A 
Al-Riqama
Abu Faraj
Ayn al-Bardah
Ein Elkorum
Amar al-Husn
Amuda
Ariqah

F 
Fairouzeh

H
Hurat Ammurin
Hwash

I 
Imtan

K 
Kafr Buhum
Kfeir Yabous
Kafroun
Khabab
Al-Kharitah

M 
Marmarita
Mayadin
Mahardah
Al-Mahfurah
Al-Mishtaya
Millis
Mashrafet Al Mriej

N
Nahr al-Bared

Q 
Qanawat
Qara

R 
Al-Raghib

S 
Shaqqa
Suran
Souq Wadi Barada

T 
Tel Tamer

Z 
Zweitina

References
Central Bureau of Statistics of Syria

 
Cities